The Honda NSF250R is a four-stroke race motorcycle from HRC (Honda Racing Corporation) developed in 2011 to replace the outgoing two-stroke Honda RS125R. Honda's NSF250R joined the newly-created Moto3 World Championship in 2012. An updated model, the NSF250RW was introduced in 2014, and won the constructors' title for the first time in 2015. The motorcycle is one of the most successful machines of the Moto3 era to date, having taken 5 constructors' championships and propelled 5 different riders' championships.

Main Features

Grand Prix Racing Results

Constructors' Championship Results

Rider's Champions 

  Álex Márquez, 2014, 278 pts.
  Danny Kent, 2015, 260 pts.
  Joan Mir, 2017, 341 pts.
  Jorge Martín, 2018, 260 pts.
  Lorenzo Dalla Porta, 2019, 279 pts.

See also 

KTM RC250GP
 FTR M3
 Suter MMX3 
 Mahindra MGP3O 
 Ioda TR
 Oral Engineering OE-250M3R

References

External links
 Honda Worldwide | MotoGP – official Honda MotoGP site
 Honda Pro Racing
 NSF250R Specs

NSF250R
Grand Prix motorcycles